The Bermuda Institute of Ocean Sciences (BIOS) is an independent, non-profit marine science and education institute located in Ferry Reach, St. George's, Bermuda. Since modest beginnings as a seasonal field station in 1903, BIOS has grown into an internationally recognized center for ocean science, atmospheric research and environmental monitoring and mapping. By investing in top-tier resident scientists and robust infrastructure—including R/V Atlantic Explorer, our UNOLS-compliant oceanographic research vessel—BIOS stands as a fact-based voice in a crowded conversation around the state of our planet’s ocean and climate. 

Global partnerships and collaborations, such our new affiliation with the Julie Ann Wrigley Global Futures Laboratory at Arizona State University, support our research programs across the different branches of oceanography—biological, chemical, physical and geological—as well as our work across the related disciplines of environmental science, resource monitoring and conservation and risk prediction.

Prior to 5 September 2006, BIOS was known as the Bermuda Biological Station for Research (BBSR). In 2021, BIOS merged with the Julie Ann Wrigley Global Futures Laboratory at Arizona State University, joining its mission to help ensure a habitable planet and a future in which well-being is attainable.

Research programs

Research at BIOS spans the branches of oceanography—biological, chemical, physical, and geological—and includes work in the related disciplines of atmospheric and environmental science, resource monitoring and conservation, and risk prediction.

BIOS is also host to some of the longest-running oceanic and atmospheric measurement programs in the world, facilitating research on both local and global environmental issues.

Research vessel
R/V Atlantic Explorer is a research vessel owned and operated by BIOS and supported by the National Science Foundation.  It operates in compliance with United States Coast Guard, University-National Oceanographic Laboratory System (UNOLS) and American Bureau of Shipping (ABS) rules and regulations.

The 170 ft Atlantic Explorer is equipped with navigation, laboratory and mechanical systems and equipment to support biological, geological, chemical and physical oceanographic research. Deploying and recovering deep ocean instrumentation moorings, conducting CTD casts, chemical sampling, and gear testing are among the number of operations within the ship's capabilities.

Ready access of two hours or more from Bermuda to the deep ocean makes Atlantic Explorer useful for both short and extended cruises, for repetitive sampling and time-series research, and for projects requiring analytical and other sophisticated shore facilities.

History
Founded in 1903 and incorporated in New York as a US non-profit institution in 1926, in its initial years BIOS was a seasonal field station for visiting zoologists and biologists to take advantage of Bermuda's diverse marine environment. After the Second World War, BIOS became a year-round research center, anchored by the establishment in 1954 of Hydrostation 'S': regular deep ocean observations of a single point in the ocean that continue today, creating the longest continuous oceanic database in the world. During the following few decades, increasing numbers of visiting scientists brought an increased emphasis on biological and geological studies.

Resident scientific programs strengthened in the 1980s as the institute became a key link in an international effort to describe and understand the ocean-atmosphere system. In 1998, BIOS established the International Center for Ocean and Human Health, considered the first of its kind to explore the ocean health/human health connection on a global scale. The Center for Integrated Ocean Observations was established in 1999 and uses new technologies to build on a century of marine research at the institute.

Other notable dates: 

1928 to 1939, oceanographic explorer William Beebe worked in Bermuda.  During those years, Beebe visited BIOS (then the Bermuda Biological Station for Research) and worked with BIOS staff.  While Beebe is best remembered for his Bathysphere dives at Nonsuch Island, he made a number of other significant scientific contributions during his stay, mainly the discovery of new species of marine life.

1978: Oceanic Flux Program begins, the longest record of deep ocean sediment-trap studies in the world. 

1988: Bermuda Atlantic Time-series Study (BATS) begins, establishing BIOS as one of two US centers for time-series studies on temporal variability in the ocean and providing key data on changing climate and the ocean. 

1988: BIOS becomes a critical link in an international effort to understand the ocean and atmospheric system as part of the Joint Global Ocean Flux Study.

1994: Risk Prediction Initiative, a collaboration between climate scientists and reinsurers, is established.

2004: The Naess Building, housing vital laboratory and office space is completed and becomes an operational part of the BIOS campus.

2006; First cruise aboard R/V Atlantic Explorer.

2012: BIOS’s on-island education courses are integrated to form Ocean Academy, a suite of programs offering experiential marine science education for Bermuda’s students and teachers.

2014: BIOS acquires its first Autonomous Underwater Vehicle (AUV), a Slocum glider using innovative technology to increase the frequency and spatial coverage of BIOS’s traditional oceanographic ship-based measurements.

2015: The Bermuda Institute of Ocean Sciences-Simons Collaboration for Ocean Processes and Ecology (BIOS-SCOPE) program is funded to study the microbial ecology of the Sargasso Sea and advance our understanding of role this community plays in the global carbon cycle.

2021: BIOS is one of 13 institutions selected to participate in a new NSF Science and Technology Center (STC) "Center for Chemical Currencies of a Microbial Planet" (C-COMP)

2021: BIOS partners with the Julie Ann Wrigley Global Futures Laboratory at Arizona State University, joining its mission to help ensure a habitable planet and a future in which well-being is attainable.

See also
 Bermuda Atlantic Time-series Study

References

External links
 Bermuda Institute of Ocean Sciences
 Mid-Atlantic Glider Initiative and Collaboration
 Bermuda Bio-Optics Project
 Bermuda Testbed Mooring
 Oceanic Flux Program
 Marine Phytoplankton Ecology

Oceanographic organizations
Research institutes in Bermuda
Organisations based in St. George's, Bermuda
1903 establishments in Bermuda
Scientific organizations established in 1903
Scientific organisations based in Bermuda